Yasemin Bradley (née Özdemir b. 1966) is a Turkish female physician specialized as a nutritionist and dietitian. She is also a television presenter and writer.

Biography
Born as Yasemin Özdemir, she graduated from the Dokuz Eylül University in Izmir studying medicine. She  worked a long time as a  prime-time news presenter at the television channel Kanal D. She moved to England and settled there when she was touched much from the destruction of the 1999 İzmit earthquake. In London, she was trained in media production management at the BBC Turkish. She married psychotherapist Anthony Bradley, who inspired her in healthy lifestyle. Upon her spouse's advice, she received education in nutrition and dieting at the alternative therapy school ITEC in London.

Özdemir Bradley translated two books of the renowned American television and radio host Larry King (1929–2012) into Turkish under the title Kiminle Ne Zaman, Nerede, Ne Zaman, Nasıl Konuşmalı (1996), II. Dünya Savaşı Aşk Öyküleri (2002). She authored with her spouse diet food books Gelecek Yiyeceklerde ("The Future is in Food") in 2002, and Bradley Mutfağı ("Bradley's Cuisine") in 2004. She edited the memoirs of a military officer and published it in 2002 under the title Parola: Harbiyeli Aldanmaz ("Password: Cadet does not get taken in"). In 2009, she published a series of three books on child development titled Cemile Doğru Beslenmeyi Öğreniyor ("Cemile Learns How to Eat Healthily"), Cemile Sağlıklı Yaşamayı Öğreniyor ("Cemile Learns How to Live Healthily"), and Cemile Boyu Uzasın İstiyor ("Cemile Wishes To Grow Tall").

In 2012, she started a television program titled Dr. Yasemin Bradley ile Reçetesiz Hayat' ("Life Without Prescription by Dr. Yasemin Bradley") at the channel TRT Haber aired Thursday nights at 21:05 local time.

Awards and honours
She was honored with the "Best Female TV News Presenter 1996" award by the "Tabloid Journalists Association".

Works

References

External links
Personal website

Living people
1966 births
Dokuz Eylül University alumni
Turkish television presenters
Turkish women physicians
Turkish physicians
Women nutritionists
Dietitians
Diet food advocates
Turkish children's writers
Turkish women children's writers
20th-century Turkish women writers
21st-century Turkish women writers
20th-century Turkish writers
21st-century Turkish writers
20th-century Turkish physicians
21st-century Turkish physicians
20th-century women physicians
21st-century women physicians
Turkish women television presenters